The Cure is a 2018 Philippine television drama series starring Jennylyn Mercado and Tom Rodriguez. The series premiered on GMA Network's GMA Telebabad evening block and worldwide on GMA Pinoy TV from April 30 to July 27, 2018, replacing Sherlock Jr..

NUTAM (Nationwide Urban Television Audience Measurement) People in Television Homes ratings are provided by AGB Nielsen Philippines.

Series overview

Episodes
In the tables below, the   represent the lowest ratings and the  represent the highest ratings.

April 2018

May 2018

June 2018

July 2018

References

Lists of Philippine drama television series episodes